Koninklijke Paketvaart-Maatschappij (Dutch for Royal Packet Navigation Company), better known as KPM, was a Dutch shipping company (1888–1966) in the Netherlands East Indies, now Indonesia. It was the dominant inter-island shipping line in Indonesia during the last half century of the colonial era.

Before World War II

Foundation of the KPM  

In 1863 the British Nederlandsch-Indische Stoomvaartmaatschappij (NISM) had won a tender for a number of subsidized shipping lines in the Dutch East Indies. As a consequence the inter island shipping lines got centered on Singapore. Furthermore all but two of the many ships required were built in the United Kingdom. The minister of colonial affairs Jacobus Sprenger van Eyk and the businessmen Jan Boissevain (1836-1904), Willem Ruys and P.E. Tegelberg then came up with a plan for a new 'national' shipping line.

On 19 March 1888 a law was made to govern the relations between the (Dutch East Indies) government and the new public company Koninklijke Paketvaart Maatschappij. The KPM had to hold office in the Netherlands or Dutch East Indies; Appointments of executives and representatives had to be approved by the government; A government representative would have access to the administration and meetings of the company; an obligation to build half of the required ships in the Netherlands; an obligation to use only Dutch commanders, navigators and engineers; and finally the government subsidies for operating the lines.

The establishment of the KPM would indeed have the desired effects. The KPM supported the unification of the Dutch colonial economy as the Netherlands expanded its territory across the Indonesian archipelago. The company brought inter-island commerce back to the capital, Batavia (now Jakarta) rather than to Singapore, which shifted economic activity to Java, and supplied more cargo for the shipping lines between Batavia and the Netherlands. Transport on this route was provided by the Stoomvaart Maatschappij Nederland (executives Jan Boissevain and P.E. Tegelberg) and Rotterdamsche Lloyd (executive Willem Ruys)

First ships  
The foundation of the KPM also had a significant effect on the Dutch shipbuilding industry. The KPM would order all its ships in the Netherlands. Especially in the early 1890s this allowed the Dutch shipyards to gain more experience in building faster ships and to catch up with the foreign competition. In a few years the KPM ordered Both, Reael, Maetsuijcker and Coen at De Schelde Van Diemen and Carpentier at Fijenoord, Reijnst, Van Goens and Speelman at the Koninklijke Fabriek van Stoom- en andere Werktuigen, Reijniersz and Zwaardecroon at Maatschappij De Maas in Rotterdam, Van Riebeeck at J en K Smit in Slikkerveer and Camphuys at Huijgens and van Gelder in Amsterdam.

Routes  
The line's routes, beyond the home islands, included services to the ports of Singapore and Hong Kong, Shanghai, Manila, Saigon; the Australian ports of Brisbane, Sydney, Melbourne and Adelaide; African ports such as Durban, East London, Port Elizabeth, Mossel Bay, Cape Town, Zanzibar, Mombasa, and the Indian Ocean ports of Réunion and Mauritius and Mahé.

Tourism  
To advance a tourism in Indonesia, the company built a hotel on Bali in 1928, launching a tourism industry in the region.

World War II
During the second world war with Japan, the ships of KPM assisted the Dutch, British and Australian war ships with the protection of Singapore. During the Battle of the Java Sea, KPM ships also assisted the supply of ammunition. In the Netherlands East Indies, several of KPM ships were rented by the Royal Netherlands Navy to participate in the defense of the Netherlands East Indies and Singapore too against the Imperial Japanese Army and Navy.

KPM ships were involved in the first months of the Pacific war in movement of supplies and troops. In January plans were made for the Aquitania to transport troops from Australia to Singapore until concern about putting such a large and valued transport loaded with 3,456 troops in range of Japanese air strikes resulted in a plan to transfer the troops to smaller vessels from Aquitania at Ratai Bay in the Sunda Strait. Aquitania and escort, the cruiser Canberra, sailed from Sydney on 10 January and reached Ratai Bay on 20 January where the troops were distributed among the KPM vessels Both, Reijnst, Van der Lijn, Sloet van de Beele, Van Swoll, and Reael and the British flagged ship Taishan. That convoy reached Singapore on 24 January.

Company ships reaching Australia during the Japanese advance through the islands were incorporated into the fleet being assembled by United States Forces in Australia (USFIA), shortly to be redesignated as U.S. Army Forces in Australia (USAFIA) and later the U.S. Army Services of Supply (USASOS), for support of the defense of Australia and campaign against the Japanese in the South West Pacific Area (SWPA). In early 1942 twenty-one small KPM vessels, loaded with refugees and limping into Australian ports, were obtained by charter for U.S. Army use and became known as the "KPM vessels" in the SWPA fleet. The means by which these vessels were brought under control of the SWPA command was complex and involved discussions with the Netherlands government officials in exile in both London and Washington as well as locally in Australia. Initially the original twenty-one vessels that reached Australia were chartered by the Chief Quartermaster, USAFIA, on 26 March 1942 with long term details to be negotiated at higher levels.

The eventual decision, involving governments in London, Washington and the Combined Chiefs of Staff, was that the charters would be handled by the British Ministry of War Transport (BMWT) for the U. S. Army. The complex arrangement was a "bareboat charter to BMWT and through the War Shipping Administration (WSA) the ships were assigned by WSA to the Army but 'not, repeat not, on bareboat but on gross basis,' though under 'full control' of the Army." In early March 1943 almost half the permanent local fleet was composed of the refugee KPM vessels:

The Coast Farmer had been sunk on 21 July 1942, and the Dona Nati had been withdrawn.

The twenty-one original vessels were:
Balikpapan (1938), Bontekoe (1922), Both (1931), Cremer (1926), Generaal Verspijck (1928), Janssens (1935), Khoen Hoea (1924), Maetsuycker (1936), Sibigo (1926), Stagen (1919), Swartenhondt (1924), Van den Bosch (1903), Van der Lijn (1928),  and Van Spilbergen (1908).

Mayo notes the fact a large ship had arrived and thus the supply line had opened as having perhaps even greater significance than the arrival of the tanks. The subsequent, routine, supply runs of Operation Lilliput supporting the Allied campaign were with few exceptions made by the KPM ships with some damaged or lost.

Two of the ships, Maetsuycker and Tasman, were converted to hospital ships to handle casualties in the New Guinea campaign. Both ships, though under United States Army control, were Dutch flagged and certified as hospital ships under the Hague Convention by the Netherlands Government in exile.

Post-war period
With the declaration of independence and the establishment of Indonesia as a nation in 1945 and 1949 respectively, the highly profitable KPM remained under Dutch ownership and management. KPM became a major focus for Indonesian activists seeking to reduce Dutch influence in the post-colonial economy. After competing with the national Pelayaran Nasional Indonesia (National Indonesian Shipping) line and demonstrations by the trade union laborers on 3 December 1957, KPM was faced with nationalization and so decided to move its headquarters and international shipping assets to Singapore in 1958. From that base, KPM bought control of Maatschappij Zeetransport (the Oranje Lijn) of Rotterdam, thus entering the European-Canadian trade. This effort was unsuccessful, so KPM sold its Oranje Lijn holdings, and the company was liquidated.

KPM itself continued until 1 January 1967, when it merged with the Koninklijke Java China Paketvaart Lijnen (KJCPL) of Amsterdam. Crews and ships continued service with other lines until finally all former KPM elements were taken over by Nedlloyd in 1977.

The company later merged into Nedlloyd, P&O Nedlloyd and finally Maersk.

Footnotes

References

Cited works

External links

 The ShipsList: Koninklijke Paketvaart Maatschappij 1888–1967
 

Defunct shipping companies of the Netherlands
Dutch East Indies
Transport in the Dutch East Indies
Shipping companies of Indonesia
South West Pacific theatre of World War II
Indonesia–Netherlands relations